Namoa Island may be:
 Namua, Samoa
 Namoa, China